This article lists the stations that end/start lines or routes in Great Britain.

England

A
Adwick railway station

Alderley Edge railway station

Aldershot railway station

Alton railway station

Ascot railway station (Berkshire)

Ashford International railway station

Aylesbury railway station

Aylesbury Vale Parkway railway station

B
Barking Station 

Barking Riverside 

Barnstaple railway station

Barrow-in-Furness railway station

Barton-on-Humber railway station

Banbury railway station

Basingstoke railway station

Battersea Park railway station

Barnstaple railway station

Beckenham Junction station

Bedford railway station

Bedwyn railway station

Beverley railway station

Birmingham Moor Street railway station

Birmingham New Street railway station

Birmingham Snow Hill railway station

Bishop Auckland railway station

Bishop's Stortford railway station

Blackburn railway station

Blackpool North railway station

Blackpool South railway station

Bognor Regis railway station

Bournemouth railway station

Bradford Forster Square railway station

Bradford Interchange

Bridlington railway station

Braintree railway station (England)

Bridlington railway station

Brighton railway station

Bristol Parkway railway station

Bristol Temple Meads railway station

Brockenhurst railway station

Bromley North railway station

Bromsgrove railway station

Buxton railway station

C
Cambridge railway station

Cambridge North railway station

Cannon Street station

Carlisle railway station

Caterham railway station

Castleford railway station

Charing Cross railway station

Chathill railway station

Cheshunt railway station

Chessington South railway station

Chester railway station

Chingford railway station

Clacton-on-Sea railway station

Clapham Junction railway station

Cleethorpes railway station

Clitheroe railway station

Colchester Town railway station

Colne railway station

Corby railway station

Coulsdon Town railway station

Crewe railway station

Crystal Palace railway station

D
Dalston Junction railway station

Darlington railway station

Dartford railway station

Didcot Parkway railway station

Doncaster railway station

Dorking railway station

Dover Priory railway station

E
Eastbourne railway station

East Grinstead railway station

Ellesmere Port railway station

Ely railway station

Enfield Town railway station

Epsom Downs railway station

Eurotunnel Folkestone Terminal

Euston railway station

Exeter St Davids railway station

Exmouth railway station

F
Falmouth Docks railway station

Farnham railway station

Felixstowe railway station

Fenchurch Street railway station

Fratton railway station

G
Gainsborough Central railway station

Gloucester railway station

Gobowen railway station

Goole railway station

Gospel Oak railway station

Gravesend railway station

Great Malvern railway station

Greenford station

Grays railway station

Great Yarmouth railway station

Grimsby Town railway station

Guildford railway station

Gunnislake railway station

H
Hadfield railway station

Halifax railway station (England)

Hampton Court railway station

Harrogate railway station

Harwich International railway station

Harwich Town railway station

Haslemere railway station

Hastings railway station

Hayes railway station

Hayes & Harlington railway station

Hazel Grove railway station

Heathrow Terminal 4 railway station

Henley-on-Thames railway station

Hereford railway station

Hertford East railway station

Hertford North railway station

Hexham railway station

Heysham Port railway station

Highbury & Islington station

Horsham railway station

Hove railway station

Huddersfield railway station

Hull Paragon Interchange

Hunts Cross railway station

I
Ilkley railway station

Ipswich railway station

K
Kidderminster railway station

King's Lynn railway station

Kirkby railway station

Knaresborough railway station

Knottingley railway station

L
Lancaster railway station

Leamington Spa railway station

Leeds railway station

Leicester railway station

Lewes railway station

Lichfield Trent Valley railway station

Lincoln railway station

Littlehampton railway station

Liverpool Central railway station

Liverpool Lime Street railway station

Liverpool Street station

London Bridge station

London King's Cross railway station

London Paddington station

London Victoria station

London Waterloo station

Looe railway station

Lowestoft railway station

Lymington Pier railway station

M
Maidenhead railway station

Margate railway station

Marlow railway station

Manchester Airport station

Manchester Oxford Road railway station

Manchester Piccadilly station

Manchester Victoria station

Marylebone station

Matlock railway station

Meridian Water railway station

Middlesbrough railway station

Milton Keynes Central railway station

Moorgate station

Morecambe railway station

Morpeth railway station

N
Newark Castle railway station

Newark North Gate railway station

New Brighton railway station

Newbury railway station

Newcastle railway station

New Cross railway station

New Mills Central railway station

Newquay railway station

Northampton railway station

Norwich railway station

Nottingham station

Nuneaton railway station

Nunthorpe railway station

O
Ockendon railway station

Ore railway station

Ormskirk railway station

Orpington railway station

Oxenholme Lake District railway station

Oxford railway station

P
Paignton railway station

Peterborough railway station

Penzance railway station

Plymouth railway station

Portsmouth Harbour railway station

Portsmouth & Southsea railway station

Preston railway station

R
Ramsgate railway station

Rainham railway station (Kent)

Reading railway station

Redcar Central railway station

Redditch railway station

Reigate railway station

Richmond station (London)

Rochdale railway station

Romford railway station

Romsey railway station

Rose Hill Marple railway station

Rugeley Trent Valley railway station

Ryde Pier Head railway station

S
Salisbury railway station

Saltburn railway station

Scarborough railway station

Scunthorpe railway station

Seaford railway station (England)

Sevenoaks railway station

Severn Beach railway station

Shanklin railway station

Sheerness-on-Sea railway station

Sheffield station

Shenfield railway station

Shepperton railway station

Sheringham railway station

Shoeburyness railway station

Shrewsbury railway station

Skegness railway station

Skipton railway station

Southend Victoria railway station

Southampton Central railway station

Southminster railway station

Southport railway station

St Albans Abbey railway station

Stalybridge railway station

Stansted Airport railway station

Stevenage railway station

St Ives railway station

Stockport railway station

Stoke-on-Trent railway station

Stourbridge Junction railway station

Stourbridge Town railway station

St Pancras railway station

Stratford station

Stratford-upon-Avon railway station

Strood railway station

Sudbury railway station

Sunderland station

Sutton railway station (London)

Swindon railway station

T
Tattenham Corner railway station

Taunton railway station

Tring railway station

Tonbridge railway station

Tunbridge Wells railway station

Twyford railway station

U
Uckfield railway station

Upminster station

W
Walsall railway station

Walton-on-the-Naze railway station

Warrington Bank Quay railway station

Watford Junction railway station

West Croydon station

West Ealing railway station

Westbury railway station

West Kirby railway station

Weston-super-Mare railway station

West Worthing railway station

Welwyn Garden City railway station

Weybridge railway station

Weymouth railway station

Whitby railway station

Wigan North Western railway station

Wigan Wallgate railway station

Windermere railway station

Windsor & Eton Central railway station

Windsor & Eton Riverside railway station

Woking railway station

Wolverhampton railway station

Worcester Shrub Hill railway station

Worksop railway station

Y
York railway station

Scotland

A
Aberdeen railway station

Airdrie railway station

Alloa railway station

Anniesland railway station

Arbroath railway station

Ardrossan harbour railway station

Ayr railway station

B
Balloch railway station

Barrhead railway station

C
Cowdenbeath railway station

D
Dalmally railway station

Dalmuir railway station

Dingwall railway station

Dunblane railway station

Dunbar railway station

Dundee railway station

E
East kilbride railway station

Edinburgh Waverley railway station

F
Fort william railway station

G
Girvan railway station

Glasgow Central railway station

Glasgow Queen Street railway station

Glenrothes with Thornton railway station

Gourock railway station

H
Helensburgh Central railway station

I
Inverness railway station

Inverurie railway station

K
Kilmarnock railway station

Kyle of Lochalsh railway station

L
Lanark railway station

Larkhall railway station

Largs railway station

M
Milngavie railway station

Montrose railway station

Motherwell railway station

N
Neilston railway station

Newton railway station

North Berwick railway station

O
Oban railway station

P
Paisley Canal railway station

Perth railway station (Scotland)

S
Springburn railway station

Stranraer railway station

T
Tweedbank railway station

W
Wemyss Bay railway station

Whifflet railway station

Wick railway station

Wales

A
Aberdare railway station

B
Barry Island railway station

Blaenau Ffestiniog railway station

Bridgend railway station

C
Cardiff Bay railway station

Cardiff Central railway station

Cardiff Queen Street railway station

Cheltenham Spa railway station

Coryton railway station

D
Deganwy railway station

E
Ebbw Vale Town railway station

F
Fishguard Harbour railway station

L
Llandudno railway station

M
Machynlleth railway station

Maesteg railway station

Merthyr Tydfil railway station

Milford Haven railway station

P
Pembroke Dock railway station

Pwllheli railway station

R
Radyr railway station

Rhymney railway station

S
Swansea railway station

T
Treherbert railway station

W
Wrexham Central railway station

Wrexham General railway station

References 
Chiltern Railways map

Avanti West Coast map

c2c map

TfW map

Merseyrail map

Tfl Overground map

Southwestern Rail map

West Midlands Rail map

Abellio Greater Anglia map

Great Northern map

Southern Rail map

Thameslink map

Southeastern Rail map

EMR map

GWR map

Transpennine Express map

LNER map

Northern Rail map

XC Rail map

Scotrail map

Lists of railway stations in Great Britain